José Fernando Polozzi (born 1 October 1955 in Vinhedo, São Paulo State), best known as Polozzi, is a former Brazilian football (soccer) player in central defender role, currently managed Bandeirante's team.

Career
Born in Vinhedo, Polozzi began his football career at Associação Atlética Ponte Preta under manager Mário Juliato. After Polozzi managed to become a regular in Ponte Preta's first team, he helped the club to a strong performance in the 1977 Campeonato Paulista which led to a role on Brazil's national team.

In career (1972–1992) he played for several number of clubs, including Ponte Preta, Palmeiras, Bangu, Operário (MT) and Bandeirante. He won Mato Grosso do Sul State League in 1986.

For the Brazil national football team he was included in the squad for the 1978 FIFA World Cup, but he never played in an international match.

References

1955 births
Living people
Brazilian footballers
Brazilian football managers
Association football defenders
Brazil international footballers
1978 FIFA World Cup players
Campeonato Brasileiro Série A players
Associação Atlética Ponte Preta players
Sociedade Esportiva Palmeiras players
Botafogo Futebol Clube (SP) players
Bangu Atlético Clube players
CE Operário Várzea-Grandense players
Associação Esportiva Araçatuba players
Clube Atlético Linense players
Marília Atlético Clube managers
Associação Atlética Internacional (Limeira) managers
Desportiva Ferroviária managers
Associação Ferroviária de Esportes managers
Ferroviário Atlético Clube (CE) managers
União Agrícola Barbarense Futebol Clube managers
Associação Desportiva Confiança managers
Ríver Atlético Clube managers
Associação Atlética Francana managers